Chasmocarcinidae is a family of crustaceans belonging to the order Decapoda.

Genera

Genera:

Chasmocarcininae 
Amboplax 
Angustopelta 
Camatopsis 
Chasmocarcinops 
Chasmocarcinus 
Chinommatia 
Deltopelta 
Gillcarcinus 
Hephthopelta 
Microtopsis 
Notopelta 
Orthakrolophos 
Statommatia 
Tenagopelta 
Megaesthesiinae 
Alainthesius 
Megaesthesius 
Trogloplacinae 
Australocarcinus 
Trogloplax

References

Decapods
Decapod families